Jane Michele Raybould is a member of the Nebraska Legislature from Lincoln, Nebraska, in District 28. She is a former member of the Lincoln city council.

Raybould works with her family at their employee-owned grocery business, B&R Stores, as vice chairman and director of buildings and equipment. She oversees capital investments and real estate developments, remodels and construction, and property management.

Raybould served as a Lancaster County commissioner from 2010 to 2014. She was chosen by Democratic gubernatorial nominee Chuck Hassebrook to be his running mate as lieutenant governor in the 2014 Nebraska gubernatorial election, ultimately losing to Governor Pete Ricketts and his running mate Mike Foley. Raybould ran unsuccessfully for the United States Senate in 2018 as the Democratic nominee against incumbent Senator Deb Fischer.

Electoral history

References

External links
Official campaign website

Democratic Party Nebraska state senators
21st-century American politicians
Creighton University alumni
Georgetown University alumni
Living people
1958 births